William Cornish (August 1, 1875January 12, 1942) was an early jazz musicianknown for his being very active on the New Orleans scene playing, leading bands, and teaching music for decades.

Career 
He was a member of  Buddy Bolden's pioneering New Orleans style band, playing  valve trombone, from about the late 1890s until 1903 or 1905, with a short break when he fought in the Spanish–American War. He was also an early member of the Eureka Brass Band. When he had a stroke which paralysed his left side before the summer of 1931, he contrived a way of holding his trombone in place with a strap so that he could continue playing.

References

1875 births
1942 deaths
American jazz trombonists
Male trombonists
Jazz musicians from New Orleans
American male jazz musicians